The Fresno Open was a golf tournament on the LPGA Tour from 1951 to 1952. It was played at Sunnyside Country Club in Sunnyside, California, a Fresno suburb.

Winners
Fresno Open
1952 Babe Zaharias

Valley Open
1951 Babe Zaharias

References

Former LPGA Tour events
Golf in California
Sports in Fresno, California
Women's sports in California